The River Cam is a work for cello and strings by the composer Eric Whitacre composed for the cellist Julian Lloyd Webber’s sixtieth birthday which he premiered on 14 April 2011 at the Royal Festival Hall, South Bank Centre London with the Philharmonia Orchestra.

It has been recorded by Julian Lloyd Webber with the London Symphony Orchestra with Whitacre conducting for Decca Records.
The inspiration for the piece was the River Cam that flows past Cambridge University where Eric Whitacre was a visiting fellow in 2010.

External links
 Eric Whitacre's website
 Album containing the piece 'The River Cam'.
 Website of Julian Lloyd Webber
 Website of London Symphony Orchestra

References

Compositions by Eric Whitacre
Compositions for cello
2011 compositions